Alice Lilian Louise Robson ( Cumming; 22 November 1870 – 4 July 1945) was a Scottish medical doctor and one of the first two women to be awarded a medical degree in Scotland.

Early life and education 
Alice Lilian Louise Cumming was born in Houston, Renfrewshire on 22 November 1870. Her father, James S. Cumming, was a general practitioner. She attended Queen Margaret College, studying arts before enrolling at Glasgow University to study medicine.

In 1894, Cumming received a Bachelor of Medicine and a Certified Midwife from the University of Glasgow. With Marion Gilchrist, she was one of the first two women who graduated in medicine in 1894. Robson graduated alongside doctor and suffragette Marion Gilchrist. They were first women to ever be awarded medical degrees in Scotland and they were featured in the international press.

It was written that Cumming would practice as an assistant in her father's practice in Blythswood Square, Glasgow.

In 1899, Cumming received a Doctor of Public Health from the University of Cambridge.

Career 
In 1904, Robson chaired a meeting of Ladies' Discussion Society. This was reported on by the Cambridge Independent Press'', who referred to Robson as a "qualified medical woman". Robson worked for the Cambridge Charity Organisation Society and Addenbrooke's Hospital.

Personal life 
In 1901, she married Henry Robson, a Scottish mathematician and Fellow of Sidney Sussex College, Cambridge. Henry Robson later became the Bursar of Sidney Sussex College.

Alice and Henry Robson lived at 10 Park Terrace, Cambridge. They lived in Cambridge and had four daughters.

References

External links 

 

1870 births
1945 deaths
19th-century women physicians
19th-century Scottish medical doctors
20th-century Scottish medical doctors
20th-century women physicians
Scottish women medical doctors
Alumni of the University of Glasgow Medical School
Alumni of the University of Cambridge
20th-century Scottish women